Maurice Howard (born August 25, 1954) is a former professional basketball player. He played college basketball for the Maryland Terrapins and played for the Cleveland Cavaliers during the 1976–77 Cavaliers season. After nine games with the Cavaliers, he played in 23 games for the New Orleans Jazz during the 1976–77 Jazz season. In 32 games, he averaged 10.8 minutes and 4.8 points per game.

Personal
Howard and Diane Coleman are the parents of basketball coach Ashley Howard.

References

1954 births
Living people
American men's basketball players
Cleveland Cavaliers draft picks
Cleveland Cavaliers players
Maryland Terrapins men's basketball players
New Orleans Jazz players
Shooting guards
Basketball players from Philadelphia